Salamullah Javid (born 1900 in Khalkhal — death 1986 in Tehran) was an Iranian Azerbaijani physician and politician. by Ja'far Pishevari with the formation Azerbaijan People's Government in 1945, was Governor of Azerbaijan and Interior Minister of Azerbaijan's Government. After the defeat of Azerbaijan People's Government was imprisoned After his release, withdrew from political activities and in Tehran paid into medicine. also Salamullah Javid was founded Azerbaijan Cultural Society in Tehran.

The works
 Two champions freedom
 Azerbaijani and Persian-language tutorial
 Political Diary

Notes

References
 *

People from Khalkhal, Iran
1900 births
1986 deaths
Azerbaijani Democratic Party politicians
Iranian communists
Governors of East Azerbaijan Province